Chalcosyrphus pleuralis is a species of hoverfly in the family Syrphidae.

Distribution
Australia.

References

Eristalinae
Insects described in 1901
Diptera of Australasia
Taxa named by Kálmán Kertész